Michael Turner (born 5 January 1951) is an Australian former water polo player who competed in the 1980 Summer Olympics and in the 1984 Summer Olympics. In 2014, he was inducted into the Water Polo Australia Hall of Fame.

See also
 Australia men's Olympic water polo team records and statistics
 List of men's Olympic water polo tournament goalkeepers

References

External links
 

1951 births
Living people
Australian male water polo players
Water polo goalkeepers
Olympic water polo players of Australia
Water polo players at the 1980 Summer Olympics
Water polo players at the 1984 Summer Olympics